ESG often refers to environmental, social, and governance, a term which encompasses approaches to investing which evaluate a corporation's social and environmental impacts. 

The acronym can also refer to:

Groups
 Election Support Group, an internationally sponsored organization analyzing and supporting the electoral process in Pakistan
 ES Guelma, an Algerian football club based in Guelma
 Escuela Superior de Guerra (Argentina), the university and staff college of the Armed Forces of the Argentine Republic
 Expeditionary strike group, a United States Navy concept based on the Naval Expeditionary Task Force
 Experimental Study Group, a freshman learning community at the Massachusetts Institute of Technology
 Galician Socialist Space, a Galician political party

Companies
 Elektroniksystem- und Logistik-GmbH, a limited liability company founded in 1967 in Munich
 ESG Solutions, a geophysical products and services company

Music
 E.S.G. (rapper) (born 1974), American rapper from Houston, Texas
 ESG (band), an American funk rock band
 ESG (EP), their debut EP

Other
 Dr. Luis María Argaña International Airport (IATA code: ESG), an airport serving Mariscal Estigarribia in Paraguay
 Earth System Grid, a data distribution portal funded mainly by the United States Department of Energy
 Elizabeth Street Garden, a one-acre community sculpture garden in the Nolita neighborhood of Manhattan, New York City
 Gondi language (ISO 639-3 subcode: esg), a South-Central Dravidian language, spoken by about three million Gondi people
 TLE1 (also ESG), a protein that in humans is encoded by the TLE1 gene

See also

References